Heqing is a town in Danzhou city, Hainan province, China. It has a population of 20,720 as of 2010.

References

Township-level divisions of Hainan
Danzhou